The Memar Marqah, or The teaching of Marqah, is a Samaritan homiletic tractate. It was written in Samaritan Aramaic by the Samaritan scholar, philosopher and poet, Marqah in the 4th century AD. The work is a collection of midrashic compositions on several parts of the Pentateuch, expanding its presentation of events and precepts with the purpose of examining its theological, didactic, and philosophical teachings.

References

Samaritan texts

Further reading
Tal, Abraham, ed. 2019. Tibåt Mårqe: The Ark of Marqe: Edition, Translation, Commentary. Berlin and Boston: De Gruyter.